Crash Landing is a 1999 Chinese thriller film directed by Zhang Jianya.

A Shanghai Film Studio production, Crash Landing follows the contours of many airplane disaster films, such as the Airport series, and stars Shao Bing, Xu Fan, and You Yong.

Plot 
Crash Landing follows the tense hours on board a stricken passenger aircraft that was on a routine flight from Shanghai to Beijing. Shortly after taking off, the pilot (Shao Bing) discovers that the plane's landing gear is unable to be retracted. Unable to continue, but unable to land, he and his flight attendant wife (Xu Fan), are forced to circle Shanghai.

Meanwhile, on the ground, a troubleshooter (You Yong) is called to see if he can get the aircraft safely back on the ground.

Inspiration 

The film is inspired by the first emergency landing in China. On September 10, 1998, China Eastern Flight 586, a McDonnell-Douglas MD-11, flying from Shanghai Hongqiao International Airport to Beijing Capital International Airport, suffered a nose gear failure after take-off. The aircraft landed back in Shanghai with the nose gear up on a foamed runway.

Reception 
Due to the film's scale and budget, Crash Landing was seen upon its release as a prime example of the growing sophistication of China's mainstream film industry, with one western media review calling it "one giant leap for Chinese cinema."

References

External links 
 
 
 Crash Landing at the Chinese Movie Database

1999 films
1999 thriller films
1990s Mandarin-language films
Films about aviation accidents or incidents
Films set on airplanes
Films set in Shanghai
Films shot in Shanghai
Films set in 1998
Thriller films based on actual events
Chinese aviation films
Shanghai Film Studio films
Films directed by Zhang Jianya
Chinese thriller films